Alec Rauhauser (born March 7, 1995) is an American ice hockey defenseman currently playing for HKM Zvolen in the Slovak Extraliga (Slovak). He was a two-time All-American for Bowling Green.

Playing career
Rauhauser was a star defenseman for Century High School, averaging more than a point per game in three separate seasons. After graduating, he joined the Des Moines Buccaneers and spent three seasons with the club before beginning his college career. From the start of his tenure with Bowling Green, Rauhauser was an effective player, helping the Falcons win at least 20 games in each of his four years with the team. As a sophomore he became one of the top players in the country, leading Bowling Green in scoring and being named an All-American. For his junior season, Rauhauser's point total declined but he was able to help the Falcons reach the NCAA Tournament for the first time in almost 30 years. Rauhauser returned to his stellar form as a senior, being named team captain as well as the WCHA Defensive Player of the Year for a second time. Unfortunately, the Falcons weren't able to return to postseason play since the season was cancelled due to the COVID-19 pandemic.

Despite the uncertainty caused by the pandemic, Rauhauser signed a 1-year contract with the Florida Panthers. Due to a delay for the start of the following season, Rauhauser began the year with DVTK Jegesmedvék. Once the minor leagues restarted, Rauhauser was assigned to the Greenville Swamp Rabbits and spent most of the rest of the season with the team.

Due in part to a change in management for the Panthers, Rauhauser was not offered a qualifying deal and released as a free agent. He did, however, eventually resign with Greenville.

Career statistics

Awards and honors

References

External links

1995 births
Living people
American men's ice hockey defensemen
Ice hockey people from North Dakota
People from Bismarck, North Dakota
AHCA Division I men's ice hockey All-Americans
Des Moines Buccaneers players
Bowling Green Falcons men's ice hockey players
DVTK Jegesmedvék players
Greenville Swamp Rabbits players
Syracuse Crunch players
HKM Zvolen players
American expatriate ice hockey players in Slovakia
American expatriate ice hockey players in Hungary